The caracal is a medium-sized wild cat.

Caracal may also refer to:
 Caracal (genus), a genus of cats comprising the caracal, the African golden cat and the serval
 Caracal (album), the 2015 album by Disclosure
 Caracal, Romania, a city in Olt County, Romania
 Caracal (river), a river in Dolj and Olt Counties, Romania
 Caracal Battalion, a unit of the Israel Defense Forces
 Plasan Sand Cat, also Caracal APC, an armored vehicle from Plasan Sasa
 Caracal pistol, a pistol made in the United Arab Emirates
 2007.2 Caracal, a release of the operating system Pardus
 variant of the Eurocopter EC725
 Caracal, a Caldari cruiser from the MMO Eve Online

See also
 Karakul (disambiguation)
 Caracole, a turning maneuver on horseback